Lynne Yamamoto (born 1961) is an American artist and art educator.

Born in Honolulu, Hawaii and a woman of Japanese descent, much of Yamamoto's work deals with content related to her identity and home. She focuses on depicting the relationship between and the influences of ordinary people on larger historical narratives such as exploring class and immigration in Hawaii in the 20th century. She has explored the use of the symbol of the cherry blossom in Japan during World War II and has considered the history of the pineapple in Hawaii in terms of its plantation connections and in terms of its significance as an exotic status symbol. In 2017 she participated in the inaugural edition of the Honolulu Biennial. In 2018, Yamamoto was one of 56 artists to participate in a pop-up exhibit for the Hawaii State Art Museum creating art in a 4-inch tin box. 

Yamamoto received her Bachelor of Arts in art from the Evergreen State College in 1983 and her masters in studio art from New York University in 1991.

She is currently the Jessie Wells Post Professor of Art at Smith College in Massachusetts.

Collections
Yamamoto's work is included in the collections of the Whitney Museum of American Art, the Los Angeles Museum of Contemporary Art and the Museum of Modern Art, New York among others. One of Yamamoto's works, "Of Memory," is also displayed at the Seattle's Central Library.

References

1961 births
Living people
20th-century American artists
20th-century American women artists
21st-century American artists
21st-century American women artists
American artists of Japanese descent
American women artists
American people of Japanese descent
Evergreen State College alumni
New York University alumni
Smith College faculty